The Oscar Vankesbeesckstadion is a football stadium, located in Mechelen, Belgium, and is host to K.R.C. Mechelen. With a capacity of 6,123. 

The stadium, located Oscar Vankesbeeckstraat, is named after Oscar Van Kesbeeck, a Flemish politician, who was chairman of the Belgian Football Association between 1937 and 1943, and a former chairman and player of Racing Mechelen. It is located about 1.5 kilometers far from the Veolia Stadium of rivals KV Mechelen.

References

ovkstadion.be

Football venues in Flanders
Sports venues in Antwerp Province
Buildings and structures in Mechelen
K.R.C. Mechelen
Sports venues completed in 1923
1923 establishments in Belgium